David Jakob Ullström (born April 22, 1989) is a Swedish professional ice hockey player who is currently an unrestricted free agent. He most recently played with Schwenninger Wild Wings in the Deutsche Eishockey Liga (DEL). He was selected by the New York Islanders in the 4th round (102nd overall) of the 2008 NHL Entry Draft.

Playing career
On June 1, 2010, Ullström was signed by the New York Islanders to a three-year entry-level contract. He scored his first career point on November 29, 2011, assisting on Brian Rolston's 3rd period goal against the Buffalo Sabres in a 2-1 win. On December 6, Ullström scored his first NHL goal against Mathieu Garon of the Tampa Bay Lightning.

On June 18, 2013, Lokomotiv Yaroslavl signed Ullström to a contract for the 2013–14 season. Scoring just 3 goals in 18 games with Lokomotiv, Ullström transferred to HC Lev Praha for the remainder of the campaign. Establishing a scoring presence within Praha, he helped the club advance to the Gagarin Cup finals.

On June 25, 2014, Ullström opted to remain in the KHL, signing for his third club, Severstal Cherepovets on a two-year deal.

On May 15, 2018, Ullström returned to the NHL after five seasons in Europe by signing a one-year, two-way contract with the Arizona Coyotes. He began the 2018–19 season on the injured reserve and upon returning to health was assigned by the Coyotes to AHL affiliate, the Tucson Roadrunners for the duration of his contract. He recorded 10 goals and 23 points in 29 games for the Roadrunners.

Unable to break into the NHL, Ullström returned to Europe, signing a contract with Latvian based club, Dinamo Riga of the KHL, on May 30, 2019.

On January 11, 2021, Ullström was traded, along with Valentin Nüssbaumer, to HC Davos in exchanger for Luca Hischier and Perttu Lindgren. 

In  the 2022–23 season, he was signed to a one-year contract with the Schwenninger Wild Wings of the Deutsche Eishockey Liga (DEL). He featured in only 17 regular season games with the Wild Wings, contributing with 5 points. Unable to help Schwenninger advance to the post-season, it was announced Ramage would leave the club at the conclusion of his contract on March 9, 2022.

Career statistics

Regular season and playoffs

International

Awards and honors

References

External links

1989 births
Living people
EHC Biel players
Borås HC players
Bridgeport Sound Tigers players
HC Davos players
HC Dinamo Minsk players
Dinamo Riga players
HV71 players
HC La Chaux-de-Fonds players
HC Lev Praha players
Lokomotiv Yaroslavl players
New York Islanders draft picks
New York Islanders players
People from Jönköping
Schwenninger Wild Wings players
Severstal Cherepovets players
HC Sibir Novosibirsk players
Swedish ice hockey centres
Tucson Roadrunners players
Sportspeople from Jönköping County
Swedish expatriate ice hockey players in the United States
Swedish expatriate sportspeople in Russia
Swedish expatriate sportspeople in the Czech Republic
Swedish expatriate sportspeople in Latvia
Swedish expatriate sportspeople in Belarus
Swedish expatriate sportspeople in Switzerland
Swedish expatriate sportspeople in Germany
Expatriate ice hockey players in Russia
Expatriate ice hockey players in the Czech Republic
Expatriate ice hockey players in Latvia
Expatriate ice hockey players in Belarus
Expatriate ice hockey players in Switzerland
Expatriate ice hockey players in Germany